Southwest Center City (SWCC), also known as Graduate Hospital, is a neighborhood in South Philadelphia bordering Center City Philadelphia. The neighborhood is bordered on the north by South Street, on the south by Washington Avenue, on the west by the Schuylkill River, and on the east by Broad Street. It is an area adjacent to the Fitler Square and Rittenhouse Square neighborhoods to the north and Point Breeze to the south.  It is home to several community service organizations, restaurants, many churches, a few retail establishments, and some light industry.

Cityscape
The area is connected by the South Street Bridge to the University City district across the river. The Schuylkill Avenue Project, as it is known by the hospital, will be an expansion of the Children's Hospital of Philadelphia (CHOP) into the area next to Naval Square. It will replace the Springfield Beer Distributor, and the former JFK Vocational Center (earlier the Marine Corps Depot of Supplies), which have been demolished.[2][3]

The project was expected to be completed by 2017 (and was completed in time) with the Schuylkill Trail extending to Christian Street according to another source.[4][5] According to the Philadelphia Inquirer article, the area is bordered by Naval Square and Grays Ferry to the east, the Schuylkill Trail and River and University City to the west, Fitler Square to the north, and Point Breeze to the south.

Names
The neighborhood has many nicknames.  The Philadelphia Planning Commission refers to it as Southwest Center City. Since the 1980s, it has been often referred to as Graduate Hospital, after the on the northern edge of the neighborhood.  This name has become merely historical in nature since the hospital closed in 2007.  Despite this, it is still used and is sometimes shortened to G-Ho.  The area is also variously referred to as South of South, So-So, Naval Square, or Schuylkill-Southwest.  A small corner of this area is sometimes known as Devil's Pocket.

Composition
The neighborhood consists primarily of nineteenth and twentieth-century rowhomes interspersed with corner stores, 22 churches and a few larger architectural landmarks. On the eastern half of the neighborhood is the Scottish Rite affordable housing complex which consists of two multi-story apartment buildings that cater mostly to elderly and low income individuals. The former buildings of Graduate Hospital lie on South Street, the northern border of the neighborhood. Along Grays Ferry Avenue is the former Philadelphia Naval Asylum or Naval Home, designed in 1826 by William Strickland. This National Historic Landmark, first constructed in 1833, closed in 1976, and is now being developed into condos. The Schuylkill Arsenal was originally built at the edge of this neighborhood, but has since been demolished.

History

Prior to the Act of Consolidation, 1854, this neighborhood was part of Moyamensing Township.  Moyamensing was originally chartered by the Dutch governor Alexander d'Hinoyossa, and in 1684, William Penn confirmed the title.

The neighborhood began taking shape after the Civil War. In 1870, it was predominantly an Irish American community; however, the neighborhood was in a transitional period, and by 1920, a majority of its residents were African Americans.  It continued to experience significant in-migration from the south prior to, during, and immediately after World War II. It remained a solid working-class neighborhood for most of the first half of the twentieth century.

In the 1960s a crosstown expressway running along South Street was planned. This would have created a barrier between Center City and the neighborhoods to the south.  The result was widespread abandonment of properties in SWCC and the decay of the South Street business corridor.  The loss of jobs and residents caused the neighborhood to decline as buildings were abandoned and left to deteriorate.

The Marian Anderson House, Franklin Hose Company No. 28, William S. Peirce School, Philadelphia, Wilmington and Baltimore Railroad Freight Shed, Royal Theater, St. Anthony de Padua Parish School, Edwin M. Stanton School, and Tindley Temple United Methodist Church are listed on the National Register of Historic Places.

Recent development
In recent years the area has experienced growth and gentrification.  Hundreds of single family homes and condominium units have been built or refurbished.  As a result of the neighborhood's proximity to Center City and increasing desirability, a variety of new businesses catering to the increasingly gentrified population have opened.  Despite the improvements, the neighborhood still contains some abandoned and dilapidated housing, especially towards the south.

The Grammy Award winning musician and local resident Kenneth Gamble founded Universal Companies in Southwest Center City to revitalize the neighborhood.  Universal Community Homes, a division of the company, began the Universal Court housing project in the neighborhood in the 1990s.  Originally, some tension existed between the company and the local South of South Neighborhood Association, but this was soon resolved as the project was deemed a success. Universal Companies has since opened several small neighborhood businesses, low-income housing, and a charter school.

Culture
Every year since 1975, the area hosts Philadelphia's Odunde festival, a one-day festival and mostly a street market catered to African-American interests and the African diaspora. It is derived from the tradition of the Yoruba people of Nigeria, in celebration of the new year.  It is centered at the intersection of Grays Ferry Avenue and South Street.

A local pub, Grace Tavern, was ranked first on Philadelphia Weeklys list of the Top 50 Bars in 2008.

References

External links

 History of Philadelphia Naval Home

 
Neighborhoods in Philadelphia
Irish-American neighborhoods
.